Skarżysko may refer to the following places:
 Skarżysko-Kamienna, city in Skarżysko County (central Poland)
 Skarżysko Kościelne, village in Skarżysko County (central Poland)
 Skarżysko Książęce, district of Skarżysko-Kamienna, until 2001 independent town